Chantal Juillet,  (born December 19, 1960) is a Canadian violinist.

Born in Montreal, Quebec, Canada, Juillet won all the major Canadian music competitions in her category by the age of 16 and was launched into international renown when she received First Prize at the Young Concert Artists International Auditions in New York City. In 1979 she was awarded the Prix d'Europe. For many years, Juillet has been a regular collaborator with and musical assistant to conductor Charles Dutoit, whom she married in February 2010.

Juillet founded the Saratoga Chamber Music Festival in 1991 and has served as its artistic director since its founding.  Juillet is also involved with music teaching through her work as head of chamber music of the Pacific Music Festival, and director of the chamber music department of the Canton International Summer Music Academy (CISMA).  In addition, in 2005, she was made a Knight of the National Order of Quebec. In 2006, she became an Officer of the Order of Canada.

References

External links
 National Order of Quebec citation 
 Chantal Juillet at The Canadian Encyclopedia
 Journal d'une création - Film directed by James Dormeyer with Chantal Juillet, Charles Dutoit and André Prévost

1960 births
Canadian classical violinists
French Quebecers
Knights of the National Order of Quebec
Living people
Musicians awarded knighthoods
Musicians from Montreal
Officers of the Order of Canada
21st-century classical violinists
Women classical violinists
20th-century Canadian violinists and fiddlers
21st-century Canadian violinists and fiddlers
Canadian women violinists and fiddlers